Monponsett Pond, also called Monponsett Lake and the Twin Lakes, originally one lake is dissected by route 58 into a system of two ponds, West and East, mostly in Halifax, Massachusetts, with a small portion of West Monponsett Pond extending into Hanson. The outflow is Stump Brook, a tributary of Poor Meadow Brook, in the northwestern part of West Monponsett Pond. The pond is part of the Taunton River Watershed. Occasionally during water shortages water from this pond is diverted into Silver Lake, the principal water supply for the City of Brockton.

Route 58 bisects the two ponds. A paved boat launching ramp to West Monponsett Pond is on this highway north of White Island Road. White Island in the center of the pond is known to have been the fishing camp of Wamsutta, brother of Chief Metacomet (also known as King Philip). 
A culvert connecting the two ponds is nearby. Route 106 runs close to the southern shore of East Monponsett Pond, and Route 36 abuts the southeast corner of East Monponsett Pond, where there is a paved launching ramp. Access to West Monponsett Pond for larger boats can be found off of route 58, and for smaller boats there is an unpaved ramp off Lingan Street. Monponsett Pond Seaplane Base is located on this pond.

External links
 

Ponds of Plymouth County, Massachusetts
Taunton River watershed
Ponds of Massachusetts